Sopotsko, is a village in the Resen Municipality of the Republic of North Macedonia.

Demographics
The village of Sopotsko is inhabited by an Orthodox Macedonian majority and a Sunni Muslim Albanian minority. Sunni Albanians in Sopotsko traditionally highlighted their religious identity over a linguistic one having closer economic and social relations with Turks and Macedonian Muslims in the region and being distant from Orthodox Macedonians. Over time these differences have disappeared through intermarriage, closer communal and cultural relations with Bektashi and other Sunni Prespa Albanian communities in the region. 

Sopotsko has 222 residents as of the most recent national census of 2002. A village with a declining population, Sopotsko also has a sizable ethnic Albanian minority.

Gallery

People from Sopotsko 
Naum Pecalev - Bekrijata (1874 - ?), rebel
Reis Shaqiri (1922 - 2006), partisan
Resul Shaqiri (1931 -), communist politician

References

Villages in Resen Municipality